"Buy Me a Rose" is a song written by Jim Funk and Erik Hickenlooper, and recorded by American country music artist Kenny Rogers. It was released in October 1999 as the third single from his album She Rides Wild Horses.  Upon reaching Number One on the Billboard Hot Country Singles & Tracks (now Hot Country Songs) charts in May 2000, the song made Rogers (who was 61 years old at the time) the oldest country singer to have a Number One hit.

"Buy Me a Rose" was not only his first Number One single since 1987's "Make No Mistake, She's Mine" (a duet with Ronnie Milsap), but also the only Number One for both Alison Krauss and Billy Dean, both of whom received chart credit for performing background vocals on the song. It was also Rogers' only Number One for his personal label, Dreamcatcher Records.

The song also hit #13 on the Hot Adult Contemporary Tracks chart in 2004 for Luther Vandross.

Content
"Buy Me a Rose" is a ballad, telling of a husband who attempts to please his wife with material objects, such as a "three-car garage and her own credit cards." The wife remains unsatisfied, however, as she prefers simpler gestures, such as the husband purchasing her a rose from a florist, or having a door held open for her, implying that he should also mind his manners. By the third verse, the singer reveals that he is actually the husband in the story; in addition, he states that he has finally realized what his wife desires. The song ends with him finally making that realization ("So I bought you a rose on the way home from work...").

Chart performance
"Buy Me a Rose" entered the Billboard Hot Country Singles & Tracks chart at number 62 on the chart dated October 30, 1999, reaching Number One in May 2000, and spending a total of 37 weeks on the charts. It is also the only Number One single for Billy Dean and Alison Krauss, both of whom received chart credit for their backing vocals. Rogers, who was 61 at the time the song peaked, also set a record for the oldest singer to have a No. 1 hit on the country charts. Rogers held this record for three years until it was broken by Willie Nelson who, at age 70, reached Number One as a duet partner on Toby Keith's 2003 single "Beer for My Horses".  It is Rogers' final charting top 40 hit on the Billboard Pop chart.

"Buy Me a Rose" was also the first independently-released song to top the country charts since "Baby's Got a New Baby" by S-K-O (Schuyler, Knoblock, and Overstreet) did so in 1987.

Weekly charts

Year-end charts

Luther Vandross version

R&B/soul singer-songwriter Luther Vandross covered the song for his 2003 album Dance with My Father. Vandross' version peaked at number 13 on the U.S. Billboard Hot Adult Contemporary Tracks chart in 2004.

Weekly charts

Year-end charts

References

1999 singles
2004 singles
Kenny Rogers songs
Alison Krauss songs
Billy Dean songs
Vocal collaborations
Luther Vandross songs
J Records singles
1999 songs
Country ballads
Pop ballads